Arthur Jackson may refer to:

People
Arthur Jackson (minister) (1593–1666), English clergyman
Arthur Herbert Jackson (1851–1881), English composer
Arthur Jackson (Irish politician) (1853–1938), Irish independent politician
A. M. T. Jackson (1866–1909), British officer 
Arthur Jackson (cricketer) (1872–1935), Australian cricketer
Arthur Jackson (Australian politician) (1874–1957), English-born Australian politician
Arthur Jackson (British sport shooter) (1877–1960), British Olympic sport shooter
Art Jackson (1915–1971), ice hockey player
Arthur Jackson (sport shooter) (1918–2015), American Olympic bronze medal-winning sport shooter
Arthur J. Jackson (1924–2017), United States Marine Corps officer, Medal of Honor recipient
Arthur Richard Jackson (1935–2004), who became the subject of a stalking incident to actress Theresa Saldana

Characters
Arthur 'Two Sheds' Jackson, a character in a Monty Python sketch